Jack Sock defeated Filip Krajinović in the final, 5–7, 6–4, 6–1 to win the singles tennis title at the 2017 Paris Masters. It was Sock's first Masters 1000 singles title, and he became the first American to win a Masters 1000 singles title since Andy Roddick in 2010. For the first time since 2004, more than three of the year's Masters 1000 singles events were won by players outside the Big Four. The win also catapulted Sock from No. 24 in the Race to London (the competition for the year-end championships) to No. 9, which earned him entry to the 2017 ATP Finals. Sock also entered the top 10 for the first time in his career.

Andy Murray was the reigning champion, but did not participate due to injury. As a result of the withdrawals of Murray and Novak Djokovic from the tournament, they fell outside the top-10 in the ATP rankings for the first time since September 22, 2014 and March 5, 2007, respectively.

Krajinović became the lowest-ranked player to reach a Masters 1000 singles final since Andrei Pavel in 2003 and the first qualifier to achieve the feat since Jerzy Janowicz in 2012.

By winning his first match, Rafael Nadal secured the year-end world No. 1 singles ranking for the fourth time in his career.

Seeds
All seeds receive a bye into the second round.

Draw

Finals

Top half

Section 1

Section 2

Bottom half

Section 3

Section 4

Qualifying

Seeds

Qualifiers

Lucky losers

Qualifying draw

First qualifier

Second qualifier

Third qualifier

Fourth qualifier

Fifth qualifier

Sixth qualifier

References

External links
 Main Draw
 Qualifying Draw

Singles